Michael Berkowitz is a UK-based American historian and professor of modern Jewish history at University College London.

Early life
Berkowitz was born in Rochester, New York. He earned a bachelor's degree from Hobart College  in Geneva, New York, and a master's degree and PhD from the University of Wisconsin–Madison.

Career
Since 2012, Berkowitz has been editor of Jewish Historical Studies: Transactions of the Jewish Historical Society of England. Berkowitz has a particular interest in the history of the Jewish involvement in photography.

Publications
Jews and Photography in Britain (University of Texas Press, 2015)
The Crime of My Very Existence: Nazism and the Myth of Jewish Criminality (University of California Press, 2007)
The Jewish Self-Image: American and British Perspectives, 1881-1939 (Reaktion Press, 2000) [US edition: The Jewish Self Image in the West (New York University Press, 2000)Western Jewry and the Zionist Project, 1914-1933 (Cambridge University Press, 1997, 2002)Zionist Culture and West European Jewry before the First World War'' (Cambridge University Press, 1993 and University of North Carolina Press, 1996).

References

Living people
Academics of University College London
Hobart and William Smith Colleges alumni
University of Wisconsin–Madison alumni
Historians of Jews and Judaism
20th-century American historians
American male non-fiction writers
21st-century American historians
21st-century American male writers
Historians of photography
Photography academics
Year of birth missing (living people)
20th-century American male writers